Mary Ann (or Mary Anne) was launched at Batavia in 1807. In 1815-1816 she transported convicts from London to Port Jackson. She then started trading with India under a licence from the British East India Company (EIC). She made a second voyage transporting convicts, carrying some to Tasmania and some on to Port Jackson. After this voyage Mary Ann returned to being an East Indiaman. She was last listed in 1830.


Career
Mary Ann first appeared in Lloyd's Register (LR) in 1812.

In October 1812 Lloyd's List reported that Mary Ann, Curry, master, was believed to have foundered. However, on 22 October she arrived at Portsmouth from Jamaica. On 27 August a gale had caused her cargo to shift and had caused considerable damage. She had to put into Bermuda to repair.

Mary Anne, John R. Arbuthnot, master, sailed from Deal on 24 July 1815. She arrived at Port Jackson on 19 January 1816. She had embarked 103 female convicts and had suffered one convict death en route.

In 1813 the EIC had lost its monopoly on the trade between India and Britain. British ships were then free to sail to India or the Indian Ocean under a licence from the EIC.

On 25 December 1821 Captain Henry Warrington sailed from Dartmouth. Mary Ann stopped at Rio de Janeiro 16 February 1822 before sailing on to Van Diemen's Land on the 26th. She arrived at Hobart Town on 2 May 1822. She had embarked 108 female convicts, one of whom had died on route. She landed 45 at Hobart. She then sailed on to Sydney where she landed 62.

She was at Batavia on 5 August. On her way from Sydney she spent 36 hours aground on the south-east side of "Gooning" Island in the Banda Sea. She sustained damage, including the loss of anchors and cables, and became leaky.

Fate
Mary Ann was last listed in 1830.

Citations

References
 
 

1808 ships
Age of Sail merchant ships of England
Convict ships to New South Wales
Convict ships to Tasmania